The Scholz cabinet (German: Kabinett Scholz) is the current cabinet of Germany, led by Federal Chancellor Olaf Scholz. The cabinet is composed of Scholz's Social Democratic Party, Alliance 90/The Greens and the Free Democratic Party, an arrangement known as a "traffic light coalition" in Germany after the parties' traditional colours, respectively red, green. and yellow, matching the colour sequence of a traffic light (Ampel). This traffic light coalition-government is the first of its kind at the federal level in the history of the German federal republic.

Following the 2021 German federal election, the three parties reached a coalition agreement on 24 November 2021. The SPD approved the coalition agreement by 98.8% (598 yes-votes to 7 no-votes and 3 abstentions) at the party's federal convention on 4 December 2021. The FDP approved the coalition agreement by 92.24% (535 yes-votes to 37 no-votes and 8 abstentions) at the party's federal convention on 5 December 2021. The Greens approved the agreement via a party-wide referendum, the results of which were declared on 6 December (61,174 yes-votes to 8,275 no-votes and 1,701 abstentions).

Scholz was elected as Chancellor by the Bundestag on 8 December 2021. His cabinet, as determined by the coalition agreement, was formally appointed by President Frank-Walter Steinmeier on the same day.

Composition
The cabinet consists of Chancellor Olaf Scholz and sixteen federal ministers. The SPD has eight positions, the Greens have five and the FDP has four.

Policy

Economy and energy 
Following Russia's invasion of Ukraine in February 2022, the Scholz government passed a gas rationing law, under the leadership of economy minister Robert Habeck (Greens). In August 2022, a major expansion of the BAföG system of government grants and loans for students and trainees was introduced, fulfilling a key FDP government program plank. The largest housing benefits reform since 1965 will come into effect on January 1, 2023, with the number of households entitled to receive the benefits increasing from 600,000 in 2022 to over 2 million in 2023, and the allowances for heating and cooling more than doubling.   The Traffic Light coalition also agreed on a major 200 billion Euro energy relief package in October 2022, to come into effect starting in January 2023 and running through mid-2024. The government announced a gas price capping scheme called Gaspreisbremse for 2023.

Labour 
In October 2022, the minimum wage was increased to 12 Euros per hour, fulfilling a key SPD election campaign promise.  The Scholz government proposed a reform of unemployment payments, moving Germany from Hartz IV to a so-called Bürgergeld system.

Transport 
In its first year, the Scholz government introduced the 9-Euro-Ticket in summer 2022. The transport ministry, led by Volker Wissing (Free Democrats), failed to prepare an adequate plan to meet emissions reduction targets in the transport sector in summer 2022. However, in October 2022, the federal government and the states agreed to implement a nationwide 49 Euro per month public transport ticket, which will apply to all local and regional transit across the country and eliminate the previous maze of tariff zones starting in 2023.

Health 
Under health minister and medical professor Karl Lauterbach (Social Democrats), the vaccination ratio stagnated at 75% (as of August 2022).

Social Policy 
In June 2022, the SPD, Greens, FDP, and Die Linke voted to repeal Paragraph Section 219a of the Criminal Code ("Strafgesetzbuch"), which outlawed the so-called "advertisement" of abortion services (a legal term). The paragraph had prohibited doctors from specifying online which kinds of abortion services they provide, and under what circumstances.

Defense Policy 
In response to the Russian invasion of Ukraine, the Traffic Light coalition joined with the opposition CDU/CSU to pass a special 100 billion Euro package to finance a re-arming of the Bundeswehr, marking a radical break with the foreign policy of the past 70 years. The funds are to be used to purchase new fighter jets (including the F-35), armed drones, boats, submarines, combat vehicles, and personal equipment. 41 billion Euros are earmarked for the airforce, 19 billion for the navy, 17 billion for the ground forces, and 21 billion across all branches of the military for new communication technology and to counter the threat of cyberattacks.

Animal welfare 
Agriculture minister Cem Özdemir proposed a mandatory Animal Husbandry Label for animal products that are produced in Germany and also destined for sale in Germany.

Governance 
In the first year of the Scholz coalition, family minister Anne Spiegel resigned, under pressure for her handling of a 2021 flooding crisis in her former role as Rhineland-Palatinate environment minister. She was replaced by her fellow Green party member Lisa Paus.

Chancellor Scholz was summoned by a panel investigating the Cum Ex affair, for his role in the city of Hamburg's decision not to prosecute a bank that had illicitly gained tax funds.

References 

Coalition governments of Germany
Cabinets of Germany
Cabinets established in 2021
2021 establishments in Germany
Current governments
Olaf Scholz